Mads Nissen (born November 17, 1979) is a Danish documentary photographer and winner of 2015 and 2021 World Press Photo of the Year.

Life and work
Nissen was born on November 17, 1979 in Hobro, Denmark. He completed his studies with distinction at the Danish School of Journalism in 2007.

From 2004 to 2006 he worked as a staff photographer for the Danish newspaper Politiken, and subsequently as a freelance photojournalist for Newsweek, Time, Der Spiegel, Stern and The Sunday Times.

He moved to Shanghai, China (2007-2008) to document the human and social consequences of China's historic economic rise. Since 2014 he has worked as a staff photographer at the Danish daily Politiken, a newspaper internationally praised for its strong commitment to visual journalism. In addition to Politiken, his images have been published in Time, Newsweek, CNN, National Geographic, The Guardian, Stern, Der Spiegel and many publications.

He frequently gives lectures and workshop and has had solo-exhibitions across Europe and Latin America in such places as The Nobel Peace Center (Norway), The National Museum (Colombia), GAF (Germany), Frederiksborg Slot (Denmark) and Festival dela Fotografia Etica (Italy).

In 2015, his photograph of two gay men in St Petersburg, from a series on homophobia in Russia, was selected as World Press Photo of the Year. In 2021 he was nominated for the prize once again. In 2018 he was named ‘Photographer of the Year’ for the third time in Denmark. He has also twice been shortlisted as ‘Photographer of the Year’ at the Pictures of the Year International Award (POYi).

Nissen has published three photo books: The Fallen (People's Press), Amazonas (Gyldendal) and most recently We are Indestructible (GOST). This book provides a glimpse of the multi-layered seams of Colombia's past, present and future and is the culmination of many years of work in the country. It provides a portrait of a war-torn country navigating the complexities of newfound peace after more than 50-years of conflict.

Publications

Books of work by Nissen
 The Fallen. Berlingske Media Forlag / Peoples, 2010. .
 Amazonas. Gyldendal, 2013. .
 We are Indestructible. GOST, 2018. .

Books with contributions by Nissen
 A New Documentary. The Manuel Rivera-Ortiz Foundation for Documentary Photography & Film, 2013. .

Awards

2006: Third Prize (with two others), Days Japan International Photojournalism Awards.
2007: Third Prize, Days Japan International Photojournalism Awards.
 2007: Winner of the Scanpix-award and grant; Best bachelor project - Danish School of Journalism
 2007:	Danish Press Photo of the Year, Best Photo of the Year
 2010:	Picture of the Year: Issue Reporting Picture Story, Third Prize
 2010:	Picture of the Year: Photographer of the Year, Second Prize
 2010:	Danish Press Photo of the Year, News Picture of the Year, First Prize
 2010:	Danish Press Photo of the Year, Best Foreign News Picture story, First Prize
 2010:	Danish Press Photo of the Year, Best Foreign Picture Story, First Prize
 2010:	Danish Press Photo of the Year, Photographer of the Year
2011: Manuel Rivera-Ortiz Foundation Photography Grant.
 2011:	Best Of Photojournalism, Best Published Picture Story, Second Prize
 2011:	Danish Press Photo of the Year, Best Multimedia, First Prize
 2011:	World Press Photo, Daily Life Picture Story, Third Prize, for a Libyan fighter standing on a burning tank.
 2012:	Picture of the Year: News Picture Story, Second Prize
 2012:	Danish Press Photo of the Year, Best Foreign News Picture story, First Prize 
 2012:	Danish Press Photo of the Year, Best Foreign Picture story, First Prize
 2012:	Danish Press Photo of the Year, Best Photo of the Year
 2012:	Danish Press Photo of the Year, Photographer of the Year
 2014:	Danish Press Photo of the Year, Best Foreign News Picture story, First Prize 
 2014:	Picture of the Year: Issue Reporting Picture Story, Third Prize
 2015:	Picture of the Year: Feature Story, Third Prize
 2015:	Best Of Photojournalism, Portrait and Personality, First Prize
 2015:	Best Of Photojournalism, International News Picture Story, First Prize
 2015:	Best Of Photojournalism, Photojournalist of the Year (large markets), Third Prize
 2015:	World Press Photo, Contemporary Issues, Single, First Prize
 2015:	World Press Photo, Picture of the Year
 2017:	Danish Press Photo of the Year, Best Foreign Picture Story, First Prize
 2018:	Picture of the Year, Best Portrait, Second Prize
 2018:	Danish Press Photo of the Year, Best Foreign Picture Story, First Prize
 2018:	Danish Press Photo of the Year, Photographer of the Year
 2018:	Best of Photojournalism: Photographer of the Year, Award of Excellence
 2018:	Picture of the Year: Photographer of the Year, Award of Excellence
 2019:	PDN: Best Photobook, Winner
 2019:	Picture of the Year: Photography book of the Year, Finalist 
 2020:	Picture of the Year: Daily Life, First Prize
 2021:	Best of Photojournalism: Photographer of the Year, Third Prize
 2021:	World Press Photo, Nominated General News, Single
 2021:	World Press Photo, Nominated for Picture of the Year

References

External links

Mads Nissen – World Press Photo

1979 births
Living people
21st-century Danish photographers
Danish journalists
Danish photographers
Documentary photographers
People from Hobro